is a town located in Kaifu District, Tokushima Prefecture, Japan. , the town had an estimated population of 8,699 in 4488 households and a population density of 27 persons per km².

Geography 
Kaiyō is located in the southeastern corner of Tokushima Prefecture on the island of Shikoku. It is bordered by the Kii Channel to the southeast and Kochi Prefecture to the southwest. Parts of the town are within the borders of the Chūbu Sankei Prefectural Natural Park.

Neighbouring municipalities 
Tokushima Prefecture
 Mugi
 Minami
 Naka
Kōchi Prefecture
 Tōyō
 Kitagawa
 Umaji

Climate
Kaiyō has a humid subtropical climate (Köppen climate classification Cfa) with hot summers and cool winters. Precipitation is high, but there is a pronounced difference between the wetter summers and drier winters.

Demographics
Per Japanese census data, the population of Kaiyō in 2020 is 8,358 people. Kaiyō has been conducting censuses since 1920.

History 
As with all of Tokushima Prefecture, the area of Kaiyō was part of ancient Awa Province. It was noted for ocean-borne shipping, especially of timber, from Tosa Province to the Kinai region . During the Edo period, the area was part of the holdings of Tokushima Domain ruled by the Hachisuka clan from their seat at Tokushima Castle. The area was divided into villages within Kaifu District, Tokushima with the creation of the modern municipalities system on October 1, 1889.

The town of Kaiyō was founded on March 31, 2006 from the merger of the towns of Kaifu, Kainan, and Shishikui, all from Kaifu District.

Government
Kaiyō has a mayor-council form of government with a directly elected mayor and a unicameral town council of 14 members. Kaiyō, together with the other municipalities of Kaifu District, contributes two members to the Tokushima Prefectural Assembly. In terms of national politics, the town is part of Tokushima 1st district of the lower house of the Diet of Japan.

Economy
Kaiyō has a mixed economy of agriculture and commercial fishing.

Education
Kaiyō has three public elementary schools and two public middle schools operated by the town government and one public high school operated by the Tokushima Prefectural Department of Education.

Transportation

Railway
 Shikoku Railway Company – Mugi Line
  -  - 
Asa Kaigan Railway – Asatō Line
  -

Highways

Local attractions
Chūbu Sankei Prefectural Natural Park.

Noted people from Kaiyō 
Toshiharu Ueda, baseball player and coach

References

External links 

  

 
Towns in Tokushima Prefecture
Populated coastal places in Japan